Bodies' Warmth is an album by saxophonist Eric Kloss which was recorded in 1975 and released on the Muse label.

Reception

AllMusic awarded the album 2½ stars.

Track listing 
All compositions by Eric Kloss, except as indicated.
 "Lady" - 3:20    
 "Joni" - 7:01    
 "Bodies' Warmth" - 11:55    
 "Scarborough Fair" (Paul Simon, Art Garfunkel) - 2:58    
 "Mystique" - 5:22    
 "Headin' Out" - 9:46

Personnel 
Eric Kloss - alto saxophone
Barry Miles - piano, electric piano, synthesizer 
Vic Juris - guitar
Harvie Swartz - electric bass
Terry Silverlight - drums

References 

1975 albums
Eric Kloss albums
Muse Records albums
Albums produced by Michael Cuscuna